Edward Brookfield (24 June 1880 – 8 February 1965) was a British fencer. He competed at four Olympic Games.

References

External links
 

1880 births
1965 deaths
British male fencers
Olympic fencers of Great Britain
Fencers at the 1908 Summer Olympics
Fencers at the 1912 Summer Olympics
Fencers at the 1924 Summer Olympics
Fencers at the 1928 Summer Olympics